Agaricus is a genus of mushrooms containing both edible and poisonous species, with over 400 members worldwide and possibly again as many disputed or newly-discovered species. The genus includes the common ("button") mushroom (Agaricus bisporus) and the field mushroom (A. campestris), the dominant cultivated mushrooms of the West.

Members of Agaricus are characterized by having a fleshy cap or pileus, from the underside of which grow a number of radiating plates or gills, on which are produced the naked spores.  They are distinguished from other members of their family, Agaricaceae, by their chocolate-brown spores. Members of Agaricus also have a stem or stipe, which elevates it above the object on which the mushroom grows, or substrate, and a partial veil, which protects the developing gills and later forms a ring or annulus on the stalk.

The genus contains the most widely consumed and best-known mushroom today, A. bisporus, with A. arvensis, A. campestris and A. subrufescens also being well-known and highly regarded. A. porphyrocephalus is a choice edible when young, and many others are edible as well, namely members of sections Agaricus, Arvense, Duploannulatae and Sanguinolenti.

A notable group of poisonous Agaricus is the clade around the yellow-staining mushroom, A. xanthodermus.
One species reported from Africa, A. aurantioviolaceus, is reportedly deadly poisonous.

Far more dangerous is the fact that Agaricus, when still young and most valuable for eating, are easily confused with several deadly species of Amanita (in particular the species collectively called "destroying angels", as well as the white form of the appropriately-named "death cap" Amanita phalloides), as well as some other highly poisonous fungi. An easy way to recognize Amanita is the gills, which remain whitish at all times in that genus. In Agaricus, by contrast, the gills are only initially white, turning dull pink as they mature, and eventually the typical chocolate-brown as the spores are released.

Even so, Agaricus should generally be avoided by inexperienced collectors, since other harmful species are not as easily recognized, and clearly recognizable mature Agaricus are often too soft and maggot-infested for eating. When collecting Agaricus for food, it is important to identify every individual specimen with certainty, since one Amanita fungus of the most poisonous species is sufficient to kill an adult human – even the shed spores of a discarded specimen are suspected to cause life-threatening poisoning. Confusing poisonous Amanita with an edible Agaricus is the most frequent cause of fatal mushroom poisonings world-wide.

Reacting to some distributors marketing dried agaricus or agaricus extract to cancer patients, it has been identified by the U.S. Food and Drug Administration as a "fake cancer 'cure. The species most often sold as such quack cures is A. subrufescens, which is often referred to by the erroneous name "Agaricus Blazei" and advertised by fanciful trade names such as "God's mushroom" or "mushroom of life", but can cause allergic reactions and even liver damage if consumed in excessive amounts.

Etymology and nomenclature

Several origins of genus name Agaricus have been proposed. It possibly originates from ancient Sarmatia Europaea, where people Agari, promontory Agarum and a river Agarus were known (all located on the northern shore of Sea of Azov, probably, near modern Berdiansk in Ukraine).

Note also Greek , agarikón, "a sort of tree fungus" (There has been an Agaricon Adans. genus, treated by Donk in Persoonia 1:180.)

For many years, members of the genus Agaricus were given the generic name Psalliota, and this can still be seen in older books on mushrooms. All proposals to conserve Agaricus against Psalliota or vice versa have so far been considered superfluous.

Dok reports Linnaeus' name is devalidated (so the proper author citation apparently is "L. per Fr., 1821") because Agaricus was not linked to Tournefort's name. Linnaeus places both Agaricus Dill. and Amanita Dill. in synonymy, but truly a replacement for Amanita Dill., which would require A. quercinus, not A. campestris be the type. This question is compounded because Fries himself used Agaricus roughly in Linnaeus' sense (which leads to issues with Amanita), and A. campestris was eventually excluded from Agaricus by Karsten and was apparently in Lepiota at the time Donk wrote this, commenting that a type conservation might become necessary.

The alternate name for the genus, Psalliota, derived from the Greek psalion/ψάλιον, "ring",
was first published by Fries (1821) as trib. Psalliota. The type is Agaricus campestris (widely accepted, except by Earle, who proposed A. cretaceus). Paul Kummer (not Quélet, who merely excluded Stropharia) was the first to elevate the tribe to a genus. Psalliota was the tribe containing the type of Agaricus, so when separated, it should have caused the rest of the genus to be renamed, but this is not what happened.

Systematics and taxonomy
The use of phylogenetic analysis to determine evolutionary relationships amongst Agaricus species has increased the understanding of this taxonomically difficult genus, although much work remains to be done to fully delineate infrageneric relationships. Prior to these analyses, the genus Agaricus, as circumscribed by Rolf Singer, was divided into 42 species grouped into five sections based on reactions of mushroom tissue to air or various chemical reagents, as well as subtle differences in mushroom morphology. Restriction fragment length polymorphism analysis demonstrated this classification scheme needed revision.

Subdivisions
As of 2018, this genus is divided into 6 subgenera and more than 20 sections:

Subgenus Agaricus
 Section Agaricus
This is the group around the type species of the genus, the popular edible A. campestris which is common across the Holarctic temperate zone, and has been introduced to some other regions. One of the more ancient lineages of the genus, it contains species typically found in open grassland such as A. cupreobrunneus, and it also includes at least one undescribed species. Their cap surface is whitish to pale reddish-brown and smooth to slightly fibrous, the flesh usually without characteristic smell, fairly soft, whitish, and remaining so after injury, application of KOH, or Schäffer's test (aniline and HNO3). A. annae may also belong here, as might A. porphyrocephalus, but the flesh of the latter blushes red when bruised or cut, and it has an unpleasant smell of rotten fish when old; these traits are generally associated with subgenus Pseudochitonia, in particular section Chitonioides. The A. bresadolanus/radicatus/romagnesii group which may be one or several species is sometimes placed here, but may be quite distinct and belong to subgenus Spissicaules. 

Subgenus Flavoagaricus
 Section Arvense Konrad & Maubl. (sometimes named Arvensis)
Traditionally contained about 20 rather large species similar to the horse mushroom A. arvensis in six subgroups. Today, several additional species are recognized – in particular in the A. arvensis species complex – and placed here, such as A. aestivalis, A. augustus, A. caroli, A. chionodermus, A. deserticola (formerly Longula texensis), A. fissuratus, A. inapertus (formerly Endoptychum depressum), A. macrocarpus, A. nivescens, A. osecanus, A. silvicola and the doubtfully distinct A. essettei, A. urinascens, and the disputed taxa A. abruptibulbus, A. albertii, A. altipes, A. albolutescens, A. brunneolus, A. excellens and A. macrosporus. It also includes A. subrufescens which started to be widely grown and traded under various obsolete and newly-invented names in the early 21st century, as well as the Floridan A. blazei with which the Brazilian A. subrufescens was often confused in the past. They have versatile heterothallic life cycles, are found in a variety of often rather arid habitats, and typically have a smooth white to scaly light brown cap. The flesh, when bruised, usually turns distinctly yellow to pinkish in particular on the cap, while the end of the stalk may remain white; a marked yellow stain is caused by applying KOH. Their sweetish smell of aniseed or marzipan due to benzaldehyde and derived compounds distinguishes them from the section Xanthodermatei, as does a bright dark-orange to brownish-red coloration in Schäffer's test. Many members of this subgenus are highly regarded as food, and even medically beneficial, but at least some are known to accumulate cadmium and other highly toxic chemicals from the environment, and may not always be safe to eat.

Subgenus Minores
A group of buff-white to reddish-brown species. Often delicate and slender, the typical members of this subgenus do not resemble the larger Agaricus species at a casual glance, but have the same telltale chocolate-brown gills at spore maturity. Their flesh has a barely noticeable to pronounced sweetish smell, typically almond-like, turns yellowish to brownish-red when cut or bruised at least in the lower stalk, yellow to orange with KOH, and orange to red in Schäffer's test. Species such as A. aridicola (formerly known as Gyrophragmium dunalii), A. colpeteii, A. columellatus (formerly Araneosa columellata), A. diminutivus, A. dulcidulus, A. lamelliperditus, A. luteomaculatus, A. porphyrizon, A. semotus and A. xantholepis are included here, but delimitation to and indeed distinctness from subgenus Flavoagaricus is a long-standing controversy. Unlike these however, subgenus Minores contains no choice edible species, and may even include some slightly poisonous ones; most are simply too small to make collecting them for food worthwhile, and their edibility is unknown.
 Section Leucocarpi
Includes A. leucocarpus.
 Section Minores
Includes A. comtulus and A. huijsmanii.
 Unnamed section 
Includes A. candidolutescens and an undescribed relative.

Subgenus Minoriopsis
Somewhat reminiscent of subgenus Minores and like it closely related to subgenus Flavoagaricus, it contains species such as A. martinicensis and A. rufoaurantiacus.

Subgenus Pseudochitonia
This highly diverse clade of mid-sized to largish species makes up much the bulk of the genus' extant diversity, and this subgenus contains numerous as of yet undescribed species. It includes both the most prized edible as well as the most notoriously poisonous Agaricus, and some of its sections are in overall appearance more similar to the more distantly related Agaricus proper and Flavoagaricus than to their own closest relatives. Some species in this subgenus, such as A. goossensiae and A. rodmanii, are not yet robustly assigned to one of the sections.
 Section Bohusia
Includes A. bohusii which resembles one of the dark-capped Flavoagaricus or Xanthodermatei but does not stain yellow with the standard (10%) KOH testing solution. It is a woodland species, edible when young, but when mature and easily distinguished from similar species it may be slightly poisonous. Other members of this section include A. crassisquamosus, A. haematinus, and A. pseudolangei.
 Section Brunneopicti
A section notable for containing a considerable number of undescribed species in addition to A. bingensis, A. brunneopictus, A. brunneosquamulosus, A. chiangmaiensis, A. duplocingulatus, A. megacystidiatus, A. niveogranulatus, A. sordidocarpus, A. subsaharianus, and A. toluenolens. 
 Section Chitonioides
Contains species such as A. bernardii and the doubtfully distinct A. bernardiiformis, A. gennadii, A. nevoi, A. pequinii, A. pilosporus and A. rollanii, which strongly resemble the members of section Duploannulatae and are as widely distributed. However, their flesh tends to discolor more strongly red when bruised or cut, with the discoloration slowly getting stronger. Their smell is usually also more pronounced umami-like, in some even intensely so. Some are edible and indeed considered especially well-tasting, while the unusual A. maleolens which may also belong here has an overpowering aroma which renders it inedible except perhaps in small amounts as a vegan fish sauce substitute.
 Section Crassispori
Related to section Xanthodermatei as traditionally circumscribed, it includes such species as A. campestroides, A. lamellidistans, and A. variicystis.
 Section Cymbiformes He, Chuankid, Hyde, Cheewangkoon & Zhao
A section proposed in 2018, it is closely related to the traditional section Xanthodermatei. The type species A. angusticystidiatus from Thailand is a smallish beige Agaricus with characteristic boat-shaped basidiospores. It has a strong unpleasant smell like members of section Xanthodermatei, but unlike these, its flesh does not change color when bruised, but turns dark reddish-brown when cut, and neither application of KOH nor Schäffer's test elicit a change in color.
 Section Duploannulatae (also known as section Bivelares or Hortenses)
Traditionally often included in section Agaricus as subsection Bitorques, it seems to belong to a much younger radiation. It unites robust species, usually with a thick, almost fleshy ring, which inhabit diverse but often nutrient-rich locations. Some are well-known edibles; as they are frequently found along roads and in similar polluted places, they may not be safe to eat if collected from the wild. Their flesh is rather firm, white, with no characteristic smell, in some species turning markedly reddish when bruised or cut (though this may soon fade again), and generally changing color barely if at all after application of KOH or Schäffer's test. Based on DNA analysis of ITS1, ITS2, and 5.8S sequences, the studied species of this section could be divided into six distinct clades, four of which correspond to well-known species from the temperate Northern Hemisphere: A. bisporus, A. bitorquis (and the doubtfully distinct A. edulis), A. cupressicola and A. vaporarius. The other two clades comprise the A. devoniensis (including A. subperonatus) and A. subfloccosus (including A. agrinferus) species complexes. Additional members of this section not included in that study are A. cappellianus, A. cupressophilus, A. subsubensis, A. taeniatus, A. tlaxcalensis, and at least one undescribed species. The cultivated mushrooms traded as A. sinodeliciosus also belong here, though their relationship to the A. devoniensis complex and A. vaporarius is unclear.
 Section Flocculenti
Includes A. erectosquamosus and A. pallidobrunneus; a more distant undescribed relative of these two may also belong in this section.
 Section Hondenses (disputed)
Traditionally included in section Xanthodermatei sensu lato, this clade may be included therein as the most basal branch, or considered a section in its own right. It includes such species as A. biannulatus, A. freirei and its North American relatives A. grandiomyces, A. hondensis, and probably also A. phaeolepidotus. They are very similar to section Xanthodermatei sensu stricto in all aspects, except for a weaker discoloration tending towards reddish rather than chrome yellow when bruised.
 Section Nigrobrunnescentes
Includes A. biberi, A. caballeroi, A. desjardinii, A. erthyrosarx, A. fuscovelatus, A. nigrobrunnescens, A. padanus, A. pattersoniae, and probably also A. boisselettii.
 Section Rubricosi
Includes A. dolichopus, A. kunmingensis, A. magnivelaris, A. variabilicolor, and at least two undescribed species.
 Section Sanguinolenti
Usually found in woodland. Brownish cap with a fibrous surface, typically felt-like but sometimes scaly. The fairly soft flesh turns pink, blood-red or orange when cut or scraped, in particular the outer layer of the stalk, but does not change color after application of KOH or Schäffer's test. Some North American species traditionally placed here, such as A. amicosus and A. brunneofibrillosus, do not seem to be closely related to the section's type species A. silvaticus (including A. haemorrhoidarius which is sometimes considered a distinct species), and represent at least a distinct subsection. Other species often placed in this section are A. benesii, A. dilutibrunneus, A. impudicus, A. koelerionensis, A. langei and A. variegans; not all of these may actually belong here. They are generally (though not invariably) regarded as edible and tasty.
 Section Trisulphurati (disputed)
Includes the A. trisulphuratus species complex which is often placed in genus Cystoagaricus, but seems to be a true Agaricus closely related to the traditional section Xanthodermatei. Their stalk is typically bright yellow-orange, quite unlike that of other Agaricus, as is the scaly cap. A.trisulphuratus was the type species of the obsolete polyphyletic subgenus Lanagaricus, whose former species are now placed in various other sections.
 Section Xanthodermatei
As outlined by Singer in 1948, this section includes species with various characteristics similar to the type species A. xanthodermus. The section forms a single clade based on analysis of ITS1+2. They are either bright white all over, or have a cap densely flecked with brownish scales or tufts of fibers. The ring is usually large but thin and veil-like. Most inhabit woodland, and in general they have a more or less pronounced unpleasant smell of phenolic compounds such as hydroquinone. As food, they should all be avoided, because even though they are occasionally reported to be eaten without ill effect, the chemicals they contain give them a acrid, metallic taste, especially when cooked, and are liable to cause severe gastrointestinal upset. Their flesh at least in the lower stalk turns pale yellow to intensely reddish-ochre when bruised or cut; more characteristic however is the a bright yellow reaction with KOH while Schäffer's test is negative. Apart from A. xanthodermus, the core group of this section contains species such as A. atrodiscus, A. californicus, A. endoxanthus and the doubtfully distinct A. rotalis, A. fuscopunctatus, A. iodosmus, A. laskibarii, A. microvolvatulus, A. menieri, A. moelleri, A. murinocephalus, A. parvitigrinus, A. placomyces, A. pocillator, A. pseudopratensis, A. tibetensis, A. tollocanensis, A. tytthocarpus, A. xanthodermulus, A. xanthosarcus, as well as at least 4 undescribed species, and possibly A. cervinifolius and the doubtfully distinct A. infidus. Whether such species as A. bisporiticus, A. nigrogracilis and A. pilatianus are more closely related to the mostly Eurasian core group, or to the more basal lineage here separated as section Hondenses, requires clarification.

Subgenus Spissicaules
The flesh of members of this subgenus tends to turn more or less pronouncedly yellowish in the lower stalk, where the skin is often rough and scaly, and reddish in the cap. They typically resemble the darker members of subgenus Flavoagaricus, with a sweet smell and mild taste; like that subgenus, Spissicaules belongs to the smaller of the two main groups of the genus, but they form entirely different branch therein. While some species are held to be edible, others are considered unappetizing or even slightly poisonous. Also includes A. lanipes and A. maskae, which probably belong to section Rarolentes or Spissicaules, and possibly also A. bresadolanus and its doubtfully distinct relatives A. radicatus/romagnesii.
 Section Amoeni
Includes A. amoenus and A. gratolens.
 Section Rarolentes
Includes A. albosquamosus and A. leucolepidotus.
 Section Spissicaules (Hainem.) Kerrigan
Includes species such as A. leucotrichus/litoralis (of which A. spissicaulis is a synonym, but see also Geml et al. 2004) and A. litoraloides. Most significantly, some species have a persistent and unpleasant rotting-wood smell entirely unlike the sweet aroma of Flavoagaricus, and while not known to be poisonous, are certainly unpalatable.
 Section Subrutilescentes
Includes A. brunneopilatus, A. linzhinensis and A. subrutilescens. Somewhat similar to section Sanguinolenti or the dark-capped species of section Xanthodermatei, but the flesh does not show a pronounced red or yellow color change when cut or bruised. Edibility is disputed.

Selected species
The fungal genus Agaricus as late as 2008 was believed to contain about 200 species worldwide but since then, molecular phylogenetic studies have revalidated several disputed species, as well as resolved some species complexes, and aided in discovery and description of a wide range of mostly tropical species that were formerly unknown to science. As of 2020, the genus is believed to contain no less than 400 species, and possibly many more.

The medicinal mushroom known in Japan as Echigoshirayukidake (越後白雪茸) was initially also thought to be an Agaricus, either a subspecies of Agaricus "blazei" (i.e. A. subrufescens), or a new species. It was eventually identified as sclerotium of the crust-forming bark fungus Ceraceomyces tessulatus, which is not particularly closely related to Agaricus.

Several secotioid (puffball-like) fungi have in recent times be recognized as highly aberrant members of 'Agaricus, and are now included here. These typically inhabit deserts where few fungi – and even fewer of the familiar cap-and-stalk mushroom shape – grow. Another desert species, A. zelleri, was erroneously placed in the present genus and is now known as Gyrophragmium californicum]]. In addition, the scientific names Agaricus and – even more so – Psalliota were historically often used as a "wastebasket taxon" for any and all similar mushrooms, regardless of their actual relationships.

Species either confirmed or suspected to belong into this genus include:

 Agaricus abramsii
  Agaricus abruptibulbus – abruptly-bulbous agaricus, flat-bulb mushroom (disputed)
  Agaricus aestivalis
 Agaricus agrinferus (disputed)
 Agaricus agrocyboides
 Agaricus alabamensis
 Agaricus alachuanus
 Agaricus albidoperonatus
 Agaricus albertii Bon (1988) (disputed)
 Agaricus alboargillascens
 Agaricus alboides
  Agaricus albolutescens (disputed)
 Agaricus albosanguineus
 Agaricus albosquamosus
 Agaricus alligator
  Agaricus altipes Møller (often united with A.aestivalis)
 Agaricus amanitiformis
  Agaricus amicosus
 Agaricus amoenomyces
 Agaricus amoenus
  Agaricus andrewii Freeman
 Agaricus angelicus
 Agaricus angusticystidiatus
 Agaricus anisarius
 Agaricus annae
 Agaricus annulospecialis
 Agaricus approximans
 Agaricus arcticus
 Agaricus argenteopurpureus
 Agaricus argenteus
 Agaricus argentinus
 Agaricus argyropotamicus
 Agaricus argyrotectus
 Agaricus aridicola Geml, Geiser & Royse (2004) (formerly in Gyrophragmium)
 Agaricus aristocratus
 Agaricus arizonicus
 Agaricus armandomyces
 Agaricus arorae
 Agaricus arrillagarum
  Agaricus arvensis – horse mushroom
 Agaricus atrodiscus
  Agaricus augustus – the prince
  Agaricus aurantioviolaceus
 Agaricus auresiccescens
 Agaricus australiensis
 Agaricus austrovinaceus
 Agaricus azoetes
 Agaricus babosiae
 Agaricus badioniveus
 Agaricus bajan-agtensis
 Agaricus balchaschensis
 Agaricus bambusae
 Agaricus bambusophilus
 Agaricus basianulosus
 Agaricus beelii
 Agaricus bellanniae
 Agaricus benesii
 Agaricus benzodorus
  Agaricus bernardii – salt-loving mushroom
 Agaricus bernardiiformis (disputed)
 Agaricus berryessae
 Agaricus biannulatus Mua, L.A.Parra, Cappelli & Callac (2012) (Europe)
 Agaricus biberi
 Agaricus bicortinatellus
 Agaricus bilamellatus
 Agaricus bingensis
 Agaricus bisporatus
 Agaricus bisporiticus (Asia)
  Agaricus bisporus – cultivated/button/portobello mushroom (includes A.brunnescens)
  Agaricus bitorquis – pavement mushroom, banded agaric
 Agaricus bivelatoides
 Agaricus bivelatus
 Agaricus blatteus
 Agaricus blazei Murrill (often confused with A. subrufescens)
 Agaricus blockii
 Agaricus bobosi
 Agaricus bohusianus L.A.Parra (2005) (Europe)
 Agaricus bohusii
 Agaricus boisselettii
 Agaricus boltonii
 Agaricus bonii
 Agaricus bonussquamulosus
 Agaricus brasiliensis Fr. (often confused with A. subrufescens)
 Agaricus bresadolanus
 Agaricus bruchii
  Agaricus brunneofibrillosus (formerly in A.fuscofibrillosus)
 Agaricus brunneofulva
 Agaricus brunneofulvus
 Agaricus brunneolus (disputed)
 Agaricus brunneopictus
 Agaricus brunneopilatus
 Agaricus brunneosquamulosus
 Agaricus brunneostictus
 Agaricus buckmacadooi
 Agaricus bugandensis
 Agaricus bukavuensis
 Agaricus bulbillosus
 Agaricus burkillii
 Agaricus butyreburneus
 Agaricus caballeroi L.A.Parra, G.Muñoz & Callac (2014) (Spain)
 Agaricus caesifolius
  Agaricus californicus – California agaricus
 Agaricus callacii
 Agaricus calongei
 Agaricus campbellensis
  Agaricus campestris – field/meadow mushroom
 Agaricus campestroides
 Agaricus campigenus
 Agaricus candidolutescens
 Agaricus candussoi
 Agaricus capensis
 Agaricus cappellianus
 Agaricus cappellii
 Agaricus caribaeus
 Agaricus carminescens
 Agaricus carminostictus
 Agaricus caroli
 Agaricus catenariocystidiosus
 Agaricus catenatus
 Agaricus cellaris
 Agaricus cervinifolius
 Agaricus cerinupileus
 Agaricus chacoensis
 Agaricus chartaceus
 Agaricus cheilotulus
 Agaricus chiangmaiensis
 Agaricus chionodermus
 Agaricus chlamydopus
 Agaricus chryseus
 Agaricus cinnamomellus
 Agaricus circumtectus
 Agaricus ciscoensis
 Agaricus citrinidiscus
 Agaricus coccyginus
 Agaricus collegarum
 Agaricus colpeteii
 Agaricus columellatus (formerly in Araneosa)
 Agaricus comptuloides
 Agaricus comtulellus
 Agaricus comtuliformis
 Agaricus comtulus
 Agaricus coniferarum
 Agaricus cordillerensis
 Agaricus crassisquamosus
 Agaricus cretacellus
 Agaricus cretaceus
 Agaricus croceolutescens
 Agaricus crocodilinus
 Agaricus crocopeplus
 Agaricus cruciquercorum
 Agaricus cuniculicola
  Agaricus cupreobrunneus – brown field mushroom
 Agaricus cupressicola
 Agaricus cupressophilus Kerrigan (2008) (California)
 Agaricus curanilahuensis
 Agaricus cylindriceps
 Agaricus deardorffensis
 Agaricus dennisii
 Agaricus depauperatus
 Agaricus deplanatus
  Agaricus deserticola G.Moreno, Esqueda & Lizárraga (2010) – gasteroid agaricus (formerly in Longula)
 Agaricus desjardinii
 Agaricus devoniensis
 Agaricus diamantanus
 Agaricus dicystis
 Agaricus didymus
 Agaricus dilatostipes
 Agaricus dilutibrunneus
 Agaricus diminutivus
 Agaricus dimorphosquamatus
 Agaricus diobensis
 Agaricus diospyros
 Agaricus dolichopus
 Agaricus ducheminii
  Agaricus dulcidulus – rosy wood mushroom (sometimes in A.semotus)
 Agaricus duplocingulatus
 Agaricus ealaensis
 Agaricus earlei
 Agaricus eastlandensis
 Agaricus eburneocanus
 Agaricus edmondoi
 Agaricus elfinensis
 Agaricus elongatestipes
 Agaricus eludens
 Agaricus endoxanthus
 Agaricus entibigae
 Agaricus erectosquamosus
 Agaricus erindalensis
 Agaricus erthyrosarx
 Agaricus erythrotrichus
 Agaricus essettei (disputed)
 Agaricus eutheloides
 Agaricus evertens
  Agaricus excellens (disputed)
 Agaricus exilissimus
 Agaricus eximius
 Agaricus fiardii
 Agaricus fibuloides
 Agaricus ficophilus
 Agaricus fimbrimarginatus
 Agaricus fissuratus
 Agaricus flammicolor
 Agaricus flavicentrus
 Agaricus flavidodiscus
 Agaricus flavistipus
 Agaricus flavitingens
 Agaricus flavopileatus
 Agaricus flavotingens
 Agaricus flocculosipes
 Agaricus floridanus
 Agaricus fontanae
 Agaricus fragilivolvatus
 Agaricus freirei
 Agaricus friesianus
 Agaricus fulvoaurantiacus
 Agaricus fuscofolius
 Agaricus fuscopunctatus (Thailand)
 Agaricus fuscovelatus
 Agaricus gastronevadensis
 Agaricus gemellatus
 Agaricus gemlii
 Agaricus gemloides
 Agaricus gennadii
 Agaricus gilvus
 Agaricus glaber
 Agaricus glabrus
 Agaricus globocystidiatus
 Agaricus globosporus
 Agaricus goossensiae
 Agaricus grandiomyces
 Agaricus granularis
 Agaricus gratolens
 Agaricus greigensis
 Agaricus greuteri
 Agaricus griseicephalus
 Agaricus griseopunctatus
 Agaricus griseorimosus
 Agaricus griseovinaceus
 Agaricus guachari
 Agaricus guidottii
 Agaricus haematinus
 Agaricus haematosarcus
 Agaricus hahashimensis
 Agaricus halophilus
 Agaricus hannonii
 Agaricus hanthanaensis
 Agaricus heimii
 Agaricus heinemannianus
 Agaricus heinemanniensis
 Agaricus heinemannii
 Agaricus herinkii
 Agaricus herradurensis
 Agaricus heterocystis
 Agaricus hillii
 Agaricus hispidissimus
  Agaricus hondensis – felt-ringed agaricus
 Agaricus horakianus
 Agaricus horakii
 Agaricus hornei
 Agaricus hortensis
 Agaricus huijsmanii Courtec. (2008)
 Agaricus hupohanae
 Agaricus hypophaeus
 Agaricus iesu-et-marthae
 Agaricus ignicolor
 Agaricus ignobilis
  Agaricus impudicus – tufted wood mushroom
 Agaricus inapertus (formerly in Endoptychum)
 Agaricus incultorum
 Agaricus indistinctus
 Agaricus inedulis
 Agaricus infelix
 Agaricus infidus (disputed)
 Agaricus inilleasper
 Agaricus inoxydabilis
 Agaricus inthanonensis
 Agaricus iocephalopsis
 Agaricus iodolens
 Agaricus iodosmus
 Agaricus iranicus
 Agaricus jacarandae
 Agaricus jacobi
 Agaricus jezoensis
 Agaricus jingningensis
 Agaricus jodoformicus
 Agaricus johnstonii
 Agaricus julius
 Agaricus junquitensis
 Agaricus kai
 Agaricus kauffmanii
 Agaricus kerriganii
 Agaricus kiawetes
 Agaricus kipukae
 Agaricus kivuensis
 Agaricus koelerionensis
 Agaricus kriegeri
 Agaricus kroneanus
 Agaricus kuehnerianus
 Agaricus kunmingensis
 Agaricus lacrymabunda
 Agaricus laeticulus
 Agaricus lamellidistans
 Agaricus lamelliperditus
 Agaricus lanatoniger
 Agaricus lanatorubescens
 Agaricus langei (= A.fuscofibrillosus)
 Agaricus lanipedisimilis
 Agaricus lanipes – European princess
 Agaricus laparrae
 Agaricus laskibarii
 Agaricus lateriticolor
 Agaricus leptocaulis
 Agaricus leptomeleagris
 Agaricus leucocarpus
 Agaricus leucolepidotus
  Agaricus leucotrichus Møller (disputed)
 Agaricus lignophilus
  Agaricus lilaceps – giant cypress agaricus
 Agaricus linzhinensis
 Agaricus litoralis – coastal mushroom (includes A.spissicaulis)
 Agaricus litoraloides
 Agaricus lividonitidus
 Agaricus lodgeae
 Agaricus lotenensis
 Agaricus lucifugus
 Agaricus ludovicii
 Agaricus lusitanicus
 Agaricus luteofibrillosus
 Agaricus luteoflocculosus
 Agaricus luteomaculatus
 Agaricus luteopallidus
 Agaricus luteotactus
 Agaricus lutosus
 Agaricus luzonensis
 Agaricus maclovianus
 Agaricus macmurphyi
 Agaricus macrocarpus
 Agaricus macrolepis (Pilát & Pouzar) Boisselet & Courtec. (2008)
  Agaricus macrosporus (disputed)
 Agaricus macrosporoides
 Agaricus magni
 Agaricus magniceps
 Agaricus magnivelaris
 Agaricus maiusculus
 Agaricus malangelus
 Agaricus maleolens
 Agaricus mangaoensis
 Agaricus manilensis
 Agaricus marisae
 Agaricus martineziensis
 Agaricus martinicensis
 Agaricus maskae
 Agaricus masoalensis
 Agaricus matrum
 Agaricus medio-fuscus
 Agaricus megacystidiatus
 Agaricus megalosporus
 Agaricus meijeri
 Agaricus melanosporus
  Agaricus menieri
 Agaricus merrillii
 Agaricus mesocarpus
 Agaricus microchlamidus
  Agaricus micromegathus
 Agaricus microspermus
 Agaricus microviolaceus
 Agaricus microvolvatulus
 Agaricus midnapurensis
 Agaricus minimus
 Agaricus minorpurpureus
   Agaricus moelleri – inky/dark-scaled mushroom (formerly in A.placomyces, includes A.meleagris)
 Agaricus moellerianus
 Agaricus moelleroides
 Agaricus moronii
 Agaricus multipunctum
 Agaricus murinocephalus (Thailand)
 Agaricus nanaugustus Kerrigan
 Agaricus nebularum
 Agaricus neimengguensis
 Agaricus nemoricola
 Agaricus nevoi
 Agaricus nigrescentibus
 Agaricus nigrobrunnescens
 Agaricus nigrogracilis
 Agaricus nitidipes
 Agaricus niveogranulatus
 Agaricus niveolutescens
 Agaricus nivescens
 Agaricus nobelianus
 Agaricus nothofagorum
 Agaricus novoguineensis
 Agaricus ochraceidiscus
 Agaricus ochraceosquamulosus
 Agaricus ochrascens
 Agaricus oenotrichus
 Agaricus oligocystis
 Agaricus olivellus
 Agaricus ornatipes
 Agaricus osecanus
 Agaricus pachydermus
 Agaricus padanus
 Agaricus pallens
 Agaricus pallidobrunneus
 Agaricus pampeanus
 Agaricus panziensis
 Agaricus parasilvaticus
 Agaricus parasubrutilescens
 Agaricus parvibicolor
 Agaricus parvitigrinus
 Agaricus patialensis
 Agaricus patris
  Agaricus pattersoniae
 Agaricus pearsonii
 Agaricus peligerinus
 Agaricus pequinii
 Agaricus perdicinus
 Agaricus perfuscus
  Agaricus perobscurus – American princess
 Agaricus perrarus
 Agaricus perturbans
 Agaricus petchii
 Agaricus phaeocyclus
  Agaricus phaeolepidotus
 Agaricus phaeoxanthus
 Agaricus pietatis
  Agaricus pilatianus
 Agaricus pilosporus
  Agaricus placomyces (includes A.praeclaresquamosus)
 Agaricus planipileus
 Agaricus pleurocystidiatus
  Agaricus pocillator
 Agaricus porosporus
 Agaricus porphyrizon
  Agaricus porphyrocephalus Møller
 Agaricus porphyropos
 Agaricus posadensis
 Agaricus praefoliatus
 Agaricus praemagniceps
 Agaricus praemagnus
 Agaricus praerimosus
 Agaricus pratensis
 Agaricus pratulorum
 Agaricus projectellus
 Agaricus proserpens
 Agaricus pseudoargentinus
 Agaricus pseudoaugustus
 Agaricus pseudocomptulus
 Agaricus pseudolangei
 Agaricus pseudolutosus
 Agaricus pseudomuralis
 Agaricus pseudoniger
 Agaricus pseudopallens
 Agaricus pseudoplacomyces
 Agaricus pseudopratensis
 Agaricus pseudopurpurellus
 Agaricus pseudoumbrella
 Agaricus pulcherrimus
 Agaricus pulverotectus
 Agaricus punjabensis
 Agaricus purpurellus
 Agaricus purpureofibrillosus
 Agaricus purpureoniger
 Agaricus purpureosquamulosus
 Agaricus purpurlesquameus
 Agaricus putidus
 Agaricus puttemansii
 Agaricus radicatus (disputed)
 Agaricus reducibulbus
 Agaricus rhoadsii
 Agaricus rhopalopodius
 Agaricus riberaltensis
 Agaricus robustulus
 Agaricus robynsianus
 Agaricus rodmanii
 Agaricus rollanii
 Agaricus romagnesii (disputed)
 Agaricus rosalamellatus
 Agaricus roseocingulatus
 Agaricus rotalis (disputed)
 Agaricus rubellus
 Agaricus rubronanus Kerrigan (1985) (San Mateo county)
 Agaricus rubribrunnescens
 Agaricus rufoaurantiacus
 Agaricus rufolanosus
 Agaricus rufotegulis
 Agaricus rufuspileus
 Agaricus rusiophyllus
 Agaricus rutilescens
 Agaricus salicophilus
 Agaricus sandianus
  Agaricus santacatalinensis
 Agaricus sceptonymus
 Agaricus scitulus
 Agaricus semotellus
  Agaricus semotus
 Agaricus sequoiae (Mendocino County, CA, under coast redwood)
 Agaricus shaferi
  Agaricus silvaticus – scaly/blushing wood mushroom, pinewood mushroom (= A.sylvaticus, includes A.haemorrhoidarius)
  Agaricus silvicola – wood mushroom (= A.sylvicola)
 Agaricus silvicolae-similis
 Agaricus silvipluvialis
 Agaricus simillimus
 Agaricus singaporensis
 Agaricus singeri
 Agaricus sinodeliciosus
 Agaricus sipapuensis
 Agaricus slovenicus
 Agaricus smithii 
 Agaricus sodalis
  Agaricus solidipes Peck, Bull (1904)
 Agaricus sordido-ochraceus
 Agaricus sordidocarpus
 Agaricus spegazzinianus
 Agaricus stadii
 Agaricus stellatus-cuticus
 Agaricus sterilomarginatus
 Agaricus sterlingii
 Agaricus stevensii
 Agaricus stigmaticus Courtec. (2008)
 Agaricus stijvei
 Agaricus stramineus
 Agaricus subalachuanus
 Agaricus subantarcticus
 Agaricus subareolatus
 Agaricus subarvensis
 Agaricus subcoeruleus
 Agaricus subcomtulus
 Agaricus subedulis
 Agaricus subflabellatus
 Agaricus subfloccosus
 Agaricus subfloridanus
 Agaricus subgibbosus
 Agaricus subhortensis
 Agaricus subnitens
 Agaricus subochraceosquamulosus
 Agaricus suboreades
 Agaricus subperonatus (disputed)
 Agaricus subplacomyces-badius
 Agaricus subponderosus
 Agaricus subpratensis
  Agaricus subrufescens (includes A.rufotegulis, often confused with A.blazei and A.brasiliensis) – almond mushroom, royal sun agaricus, and various fanciful names
 Agaricus subrufescentoides
  Agaricus subrutilescens – wine-colored agaricus
 Agaricus subsaharianus  L.A.Parra, Hama & De Kesel (2010)
 Agaricus subsilvicola
 Agaricus subsquamuliferus
 Agaricus subsubensis Kerrigan (2008) (California)
 Agaricus subtilipes
 Agaricus subvariabilis
 Agaricus sulcatellus
 Agaricus sulphureiceps
 Agaricus summensis Kerrigan (1985)
 Agaricus suthepensis
 Agaricus taculensis
 Agaricus taeniatimpictus
 Agaricus taeniatus
 Agaricus tantulus
 Agaricus tennesseensis
 Agaricus tenuivolvatus
 Agaricus tephrolepidus
 Agaricus termiticola
 Agaricus termitum
 Agaricus thiersii
 Agaricus thujae
 Agaricus tibetensis
 Agaricus tlaxcalensis Callac & G.Mata (2008) (Tlaxcala)
 Agaricus tollocanensis
 Agaricus toluenolens
 Agaricus trinitatensis
 Agaricus trisulphuratus (formerly in Cystoagaricus)
 Agaricus trutinatus
 Agaricus tucumanensis
 Agaricus tytthocarpus
 Agaricus umboninotus
 Agaricus unguentolens
 Agaricus unitinctus
  Agaricus urinascens
 Agaricus valdiviae
 Agaricus vaporarius
 Agaricus variabilicolor
 Agaricus variegans
 Agaricus variicystis
 Agaricus valdiviae
 Agaricus velenovskyi
 Agaricus veluticeps
 Agaricus venus
 Agaricus vinaceovirens (San Francisco Peninsula)
 Agaricus vinosobrunneofumidus
 Agaricus viridarius
 Agaricus viridopurpurascens
 Agaricus volvatulus
 Agaricus wariatodes
 Agaricus weberianus
 Agaricus wilmotii
 Agaricus woodrowii
 Agaricus wrightii
 Agaricus xanthodermoides
 Agaricus xanthodermulus
  Agaricus xanthodermus – yellow-staining mushroom
 Agaricus xantholepis
 Agaricus xanthosarcus
 Agaricus xeretes
 Agaricus xuchilensis
 Agaricus yunnanensis
 Agaricus zelleri

References

Sources

External links

 MycoKey - The Genus Agaricus
 Mushroom Expert - The Genus Agaricus
 Varieties of California, USA on MYKOWEB .com
 Agaricus page at Index Fungorum
 On-line nomenclature of Agaricus from Royal Botanic Garden, Madrid. CSIC

 
Agaricales genera